The 2010 U.S. Open 9-ball Championship is the 35th annual men's U.S. Open 9-Ball Championships. The championship was held at Chesapeake Conference Center, Chesapeake, Virginia from October 17 to 23, 2010. Finland's Mika Immonen was the defending champion. Unlike most sports tournaments, women are allowed to enter the main draw. The event was won by Darren Appleton defeating Corey Deuel 15–13 in the final.

Rules
Double elimination tournament
Winner's break
No soft breaks
At the final day, winning margin should be two racks or more. If the scores are hill-hill, a player has to win two consecutive racks to win the match.

Winners' bracket

Section 1

Section 2
*Forfeit

Section 3

Section 4

Section 5
*Forfeit

Section 6

Section 7

Section 8
*Forfeit

Losers' bracket from second to fifth rounds

Section 1

*Forfeit

Section 2

*Forfeit

Section 3

Section 4

*Forfeit

Section 5

*Forfeit

Section 6

Section 7

Section 8

Losers' bracket from sixth to eighth round

Sections 1 and 2

Sections 3 and 4

Sections 5 and 6

Sections 7 and 8

Losers' bracket from ninth to twelfth rounds

Top half

Bottom half

Final 12 players

External links
Official website
AzBilliards.com

U.S. Open 9-ball Championship
U.S. Open 9-ball Championship
U.S Open 9-Ball championship